USCGC Jackson (WSC-142, formally WPC-142) was an  cutter of the United States Coast Guard. She capsized in 1944, killing twenty one of forty crew members.

Design and construction 
They were meant to be able to stay at sea for long periods of time in any kinds of weather, and were able to expand berthing space via hammocks of the need arises, such as if a large amount of survivors were on board. Built by the American Brown Boveri Electric Corporation of Camden, New Jersey, she was laid down on 2 December 1927. The cutter was launched on 14 February 1927 and commissioned exactly one month later. A single  gun was mounted as the offensive weapon as launch.

Service history 
Jackson was first assigned to USCG Station Boston to serve out her designated role along the New England Coast. After prohibition ended in 1933, she was deployed to U.S. Coast Guard Station Rochester in the Great Lakes. Here, the vessel was attached to conduct more routine operations, such as search and rescue, fisheries patrols, and law enforcement. As the Second World War worsened, she was once again reassigned to the East Coast under the Eastern Sea Frontier (EASTSEAFRON) of the United States Navy. The name and hull numbers were kept. In February 1942, her class was redesignated from WPC as a coast guard cutter to WSC, or coast guard sub chaser. Jackson joined the war effort by escorting vessels and convoys, conducting crew and ship rescues and serving in anti-submarine patrols. She was refitted with a heavier main gun, deck gear, and depth charges in the late 1930s. These changes had the effect of making the ship more top-heavy, making it easier to capsize. Between her return to the East Coast and her sinking, she operated from Morehead City, North Carolina.

Sinking and rescue 
After arriving in the area near the Outer Banks, weather conditions quickly deteriorated to hurricane conditions throughout the morning.  winds forced the ship to close all hatches and secure deck equipment. This included disarming the depth charges, which may have avoided accidental discharge. Maneuverability and communications became much more difficult and the ship was thrown around. Large swells began to lift the ship to its crest before immediately dropping the vessel to its trough about 100 feet below. The first two of such waves caused the ship to crash into the water, causing it to list 60 and 110 degrees respectively. The situation got to the point where the mast was temporarily submerged in sea water. After being hit by a similar wave, the listing ship failed to self right and immediately capsized at around 10:30 AM. Thirty seven crew members were able to successfully abandon ship, but the high winds and waves scattered survivors and repeatedly flipped rafts. Ironically, the crew of Jackson believed they would soon be rescued by sister ship Bedloe, not knowing she sank two and a half hours after theirs in similar conditions. The crew of Bedloe likewise believed the same about being rescued by Jackson, not knowing its situation. An additional seventeen crew members later died from exposure to the elements or exhaustion over the next 58 hours. The remaining twenty would also endure survival in shark-infested waters before being saved. Their raft was spotted by a Coast Guard aircraft operating from Elizabeth City, North Carolina. Rescue aircraft began landing along the crew members as United States Navy blimps dropped emergency food and coordinated a rescue. A third 38-foot cutter from Oregon Inlet Lifeboat Station picked up survivors to be transferred to a navy minesweeper before being hospitalized.

Wreck 
Some point after sinking the ship broke in two. The ship now rests several hundred feet (roughly 100 meters) away from the wrecks of a landing craft and that of MV Advance II.

Legacy 
In total, 47 guardsmen would lose their lives in the twin sinkings, including 21 on Jackson. No bodies from the incident were recovered. After the sinking, the United States Navy transferred the then USS PCE(R)-858 to the United States Coast Guard where it was renamed USCGC Jackson (WPC-120) to cover the loss on 28 February 1946. Due to lack of crew, the new ship was berthed at Curtis Bay, Maryland until her decommissioning on 23 December 1947.

Gallery

See also 
 Rogue wave

References

External links 
 ibiblio: HyperWar: The Coast Guard At War: Lost Cutters: Bedloe and Jackson — Website which accurately lists the missing guardsmen from Jackson

Ships of the United States Coast Guard
Active-class patrol boats
Shipwrecks in the Atlantic Ocean
Ships built in Camden, New Jersey
Brown, Boveri & Cie